Slovart Music is an independent publisher of classical music in Slovakia. According to the company's website, it is "the oldest and largest independent music publishing house" in its country.

Select artists (composers)
Vladimír Godár
Miro Bázlik
Roman Berger
Jozef Lupták
Ivan Parík
Amaral Vieira
György Kurtág
Peter Zagar

See also
 List of record labels

References

External links
 SlovartMusic.com – Official site
 CD Diffusion-France – Distribution
 Sarabande-Japan – Distribution

Slovak record labels
Classical music record labels
20th-century classical music